The Mat Salleh Rebellion was a series of major armed disturbances against the British North Borneo Chartered Company administration in North Borneo, now the Malaysian state of Sabah. It was instigated by Datu Muhammad Salleh (also known as Mat Salleh), a local chief from the Lingkabo district and Sugut River. He led the rebellion between 1894 until his death in Tambunan in 1900. The rebellion then continued on for another five years until 1905.

His revolts were widely supported by the local communities and affected a large geographical area from Sandakan, across Gaya Island, including the interior, especially Tambunan. His most notable uprising occurred at midnight on 9 July 1897, when he led his followers to successfully attack a major colonial settlement on Gaya Island.

Biography of Mat Salleh

Mat Salleh was born in Inanam. His father was Datu Balu, a traditional leader in Inanam and a member of the Suluk community. His mother was of Bajau descent. He had three siblings: Ali, Badin and Bolong. The family moved to Sugut, which unlike Inanam, was in the Company's concession but since the abandonment of its tobacco estates, it had reportedly been "left largely to its own devices", and enjoyed relative autonomy. There, Datu Bulu assumed a local leadership position along part of the Sugut River on the eastern coast of North Borneo.

Later in his life, Mat Salleh married a Sulu princess named Dayang Bandang. She was related to the Sultan of Sulu's family and her village was at Penggalaban (maguindanaun dialogue), Paitan. He later inherited his father's local leadership position as the village chieftain in the Lingkabau district and Sungei Sugut.

Mat Salleh was often physically described as slender and tall, with pockmarked features. He was also well known as a mysterious   and intelligent man, with a commanding personality and presence. He was well-respected and his great tactical skills were renowned among the local communities.

Salleh's supporters

His mixed parentage and role as a traditional local leader which he had inherited from his father contributed to his significant Bajau and Suluk following. Also, his marriage to Dayang Bandang, who was related to the ruling family in Sulu helped him win more supporters.

However, his wide support not only came from his family affiliations and connections. He was also able to garner supporters from Dusun communities spread over a sizeable geographical area in Sabah and had the Tagahas communities as allies, among others. He was skilled at connecting with and uniting other communities, making him a great personage among the multi-ethnic indigenous people. For example, some accounts claim that he used and married various symbols of authority and mysticism that the different communities could relate with to attest to his leadership position and military prowess. 

The large geographical areas where his support came from proved instrumental in ensuring the initial success of his revolt as these areas were available to provide power bases, supplies and construction of forts. This also implied that he and his army had ample mobility between forts and bases, which explains their successful repeated evasions of the Company's troops. From 1895 to 1897, he had at his disposal at least six forts which were well-prepared with resources and manpower that he could mobilise at short notice.

The forts that his followers built were impressively very well designed and constructed. They were reportedly to have been the:-

The British North Borneo Chartered Company

Changes imposed

Before the arrival of the British North Borneo Chartered Company, central authority in Sabah was weak. Part of it was governed by Brunei and part by the Sulu government. This gave local chiefs and traditional elites relative autonomy to practice influence and power to regulate trade in the area and serve the responsibility of protecting the local inhabitants from excessive exploitation by foreign traders.

The British arrived during the late 19th century, and their administration (under the London-based British North Borneo Chartered Company) in North Borneo lasted sixty years, between 1881 and 1941. It aimed to transform North Borneo into a producer of various agricultural products, predominantly tobacco. Apart from the introduction of cash-crop farming, the Company also imposed new taxation laws and set up administrative centres. Some of the changes brought about by them were:
 Introduction of new taxes, including a levy on rice, the staple food of the population.
 Poll-tax and passes for boats on local communities, including members of the local elites and traditional leaders.
 Mandatory licenses for local boat owners.
 Passed a Village Ordinance, resulting in the Company not sanctioning the authority and traditional social position of a large number of traditional elites and local chiefs. This consequently alienated them and undermined their roles and social statuses.
 A customs station was built on Jambongan Island, staffed by a non-European clerk and policeman.
 A new police station was established on the Kinarom.

In its attempt to revitalise the sagging economy, then managing director of the British North Borneo Company, William C. Cowie also launched two major projects:
 The construction of a cross-country rail between Brunei Bay and Cowie Harbour
 A telegraphic line from Labuan to Sandakan

New levies were imposed to finance these large-scale projects. Lack of manpower, however, caused the Company to rely on local chieftains as agents for revenue collection. Among those who cooperated with the Company, some abused their authority and overtaxed the natives, exacerbating dissatisfaction among local people already burdened by other new laws imposed by the Company. Mat Salleh viewed the Company's new rules as an infringement of native rights, refused to acknowledge the Company's authority, and continued to collect taxes from traders traveling via the Sugut River as he had before the rules were imposed, without turning them over to the Company. Numerous other local chiefs shared Mat Salleh's strong opinions against the Company's new rules. Many of them later joined his cause.

Administrative centre relocated from Gaya Island to the mainland
The Company had set up its initial administrative centres on the west coast of Sabah in Papar and Tempassuk. In between these areas also stood the Gaya station, set up in September 1882 as a collection station for jungle and local produce. This station also served as a "stopping place" for European officials plying between Kudat and Labuan.
Gaya Island was initially thought of as a highly prospective settlement site and a possible port of call. It later however, did not flourish as expected; trade, collection of local produce and other economic activities did not prosper.  After the station in Gaya was raided and torched by Mat Salleh and his followers in July 1897, the British relocated to the mainland, in Gantian.

Mat Salleh uprisings, 1895–1905

1894
Mat Salleh first came to the Company's attention when he was suspected of involvement in the murder and robbery of two Iban traders on the Sugut River in 1894. Captain Barnett and a few other colonial officials were sent to Mat Salleh's residence to investigate the matter. Mat Salleh denied his and his followers’ involvement in it and resisted arrest. This incident marked the first of many misunderstandings, creating a tense and hostile situation between both parties.

1895 (Sandakan incident)
In August 1895, in an attempt to have their grievances addressed through the colonial institution, Mat Salleh, his followers and traditional chiefs from Sugut went to Sandakan, then the seat of the government of North Borneo, to present a petition against the collection of poll-tax and the imposition of passes on boats by Government chiefs to then governor L. P. Beaufort and his representatives. They were however, away on another expedition. Treasurer-in-general Alexander Cook, who was aware of their visit instead denied them an audience. After two days of waiting, Mat Salleh and his party left and headed back

Following this, a complaint against Mat Salleh and his party was forwarded to the governor and other colonial officials by Cook. In response, on 29 August 1895, representatives from the Company arrived at Mat Salleh's home in Jambongan to arrest him and four of his followers on the grounds of disturbing the peace at Sandakan and involvement with the murders of the two Ibans in 1894. Mat Salleh refused to comply and escaped. This led to his house and village being attacked, burned and looted. The company then announced him as a wanted man. A Straits $500 reward was offered for his capture.

This incident triggered him to wage war against the British North Borneo Chartered Company. He then consolidated his position at Lingkabau, approximately 50 miles up the Sugut river and with strong support from the native Dusun community there, built a strong fort. The British subsequently attacked it but failed to capture him. Instead, they destroyed it and captured about 60 Dusun as prisoners of war.

After this, he re-established himself in Labuk and built his headquarters at Limbawan. He had received support from the Labuk people as well. In September 1896, the British made another attack, surrounding Limbawan and cutting off possible escape routes. Again, they failed to apprehend him, although they managed to capture and demolish fort. Following their escape, Mat Salleh and his followers built another fort at Padang at Ulu Sugut.

1897 (Gaya attack)
At midnight on 9 July 1897, Mat Salleh successfully led his followers to attack the Company's settlement on Gaya Island. They raided and torched the Gaya compound before escaping with loot estimated to be worth Straits $100,000. They also took hostage F. S. Neubronner, the treasury clerk. The success of this attack increased his reputation as a local hero. This helped to further widen his reach, influence and support. After this attack, the Company proceeded to seek compensation from the Brunei Sultanate. The managing director, Cowie and the Governor, L. P. Beaufort, visited the Sultan of Brunei seeking compensation, claiming that some of the attackers were from regions under his jurisdiction. These areas were also claimed to have had been used as bases by Mat Salleh. The negotiations brought the Mengkabong, Manggatal and Api-Api districts (opposite of Gaya Island) under the Company's administration.

After the successful attack on Gaya Island, Mat Salleh and his followers moved on to a fort on the Soan on the Labuk, then Parachangan on the Sugut, then proceeded to attack and burn down the government residency at Ambong in November 1897.

Following this, he established his next fort at Ranau. On 13 December 1897, the Company attacked this Fort. They were defeated and lost about 10 men, including an Officer Jones, who had led the attack. On 9 January 1898, they attacked the fort for a second time with a bigger troop and captured it. However, by then, Mat Salleh and his men had already abandoned the fort and established a new one in the interior of Tambunan.

The Tambunan fort was stronger and more stable than his previous fort. It was reported to have been

This was also the last fort he used for defence during the rebellion.

1898 (Palatan Peace Pact)

The tit-for-tat dual reached deadlock by early 1898. Cowie, managing director to the court of directors of the British North Borneo Chartered Company, personally travelled from London to arrange peace talks and a peace pact with Mat Salleh (the Palatan Peace Pact). Simultaneously, the Sultan of Sulu wrote a letter to Dayang Bandung, Mat Salleh's wife, urging a peace settlement with Cowie.

The meeting occurred at Kampung Palatan in Ulu Menggatal on 19 April 1898. Mat Salleh was offered a pardon if resistance ceased. Cowie verbally promised amnesty and to allow Mat Salleh to settle in the Tambunan Valley, pledging noninterference from the government. Mat Salleh acceded and offered to accept it on two conditions:
 The release of his imprisoned men; and,
 That he be allowed to stay at Inanam.

Cowie refused these conditions, permitting Mat Salleh only to stay in Tambunan or parts of the interior excluding Sugut and Lambuk, his former strongholds. In addition, Cowie made an additional promise that if Mat Sallah kept his peace for twelve consecutive months and cooperated with the Company, Cowie would recommend Mat Sallah to the court of directors for an appointment as chief or headman of a district.

On 20 April 1898, Cowie, governor L.P Beufort and two officers (P. Wise and A. Terms) met with Mat Salleh again and this time, he was allowed "to live in the interior and take charge of the Tambunan district". With this, a ceremony was held to mark Mat Salleh's official possession of the Menggatal River on 22 April 1898. The next day, on 23 April 1898, the Company sent an official document to Mat Salleh to sign. The document stated that:
 Mat Salleh and his men were to be pardoned except those remaining in prison and those who had previously escaped;
 Mat Salleh could stay in Tambunan or elsewhere within the interior except the Sugut and Labuk rivers;
 That he was to report to the district officer on occasions he visited the coast

1899
Mat Salleh and his allies were at war with the Taiwan communities. The latter approached the Company with urgent appeals for its intervention. This led to the governor, Beaufort, on 15 January 1899, visiting the Taiwan villages and obtaining an oath of allegiance from them. This was also, apparently, a strategic move by the Company. to pursue its plans to establish an administrative centre in Tambunan.

Seeing this as a breach of faith to their earlier agreement, Mat Salleh prepared to resume resistance against the Company. In December 1899, R. M. Little, the resident of Labuan, was instructed to initiate negotiations. Mat Salleh refused negotiations and demanded their withdrawal from Tambunan. They refused.  Almost immediately after this, Mat Salleh and his followers resumed waging sporadic attacks.

1900–1905 (Mat Salleh's defeat)

The Company sent a force to retaliate. They reached Tambunan 31 December 1899 and fighting commenced the next day. On 10 January 1900, the village of Laland was lost to the Company. Mat Salleh lost 60 men. On 15 January 1900, the Company proceeded to acquire Taga villages and the fort of one of Mat Salleh's chief lieutenants; Mat Sator was burned by shell-fire. They then cut the water supply to Mat Salleh's fort by diverting the Pengkalian river to the Sensuran. On 27 January 1900, Mat Salleh's fort was surrounded and shelled continuously for the next four days. The seemingly impenetrable fort finally fell due to a massive onslaught by the Company, and with this, Mat Salleh's final defences were finally broken.

On 31 January 1900, Mat Salleh was killed by machine gun-fire by mid-day. A chance shot from a Maxim Gun had hit Mat Salleh in the left temple, killing him instantly.  Also killed in the battle were about 1000 of Mat Salleh's followers who fought from the neighbouring villages of Lotud Tondulu, Piasau, Kitutud, Kepayan and Sunsuron.

It was, however, another five years before the remnants of Mat Salleh's men surrendered, were killed or captured by the Company, resulting in the end of the rebellion in 1905.

Mat Salleh's memorial

The Mat Salleh memorial was opened in 1999 at the exact site where he was killed at Kampung Tibabar in Tambunan, as a tribute to remember Mat Salleh, who stood up and led a rebellion against the Company's rule. It was demolished in 2015.

The memorial, which resembled a fort, was surrounded by a garden. It housed Mat Salleh's photograph and some photos of his weapons and paraphernalia from the rebellion he led. A bronze plaque, set apart some metres from the building, still stands there and reads:

After the memorial was opened, an article published in The New Straits Times on 9 March 2000 reported Sabah museum director and Tambunan local, Joseph Pounis Guntavid, as suggesting that "a search and study on Mat Salleh's actions strongly indicated that he was not a rebel but a warrior who went against foreign rule, fighting for North Borneo ‘self-government’...Mat Salleh initiated patriotism that led the people to fight for self-rule until Sabah gained her independence through Malaysia on 16 September 1963".

Mat Salleh, however, is not always seen as a hero. Many writers of this rebellion see Mat Salleh as a lone crusader or an opportunist solely interested in restoring his precolonial social position of power. To the British North Borneo Chartered Company, he was a rebel and troublemaker, while to his supporters, he was a fierce and skilled warrior, a reputation which remains today.

Notes

References

External links
 Visit the Memorial.
 Read about an official biographical movie on Mat Salleh.
 Watch a fan video on Mat Salleh's life (part 1 / part 2).
 This entry mentions many parts of Sabah. Refer to a map of Sabah to follow Mat Salleh's movements throughout the rebellion.

Conflicts in 1894
Conflicts in 1895
Conflicts in 1896
Conflicts in 1897
Conflicts in 1898
Conflicts in 1899
Conflicts in 1900
Conflicts in 1901
Conflicts in 1902
Conflicts in 1903
Conflicts in 1904
Conflicts in 1905
19th-century rebellions
20th-century rebellions
19th century in Malaysia
20th century in Malaysia
Military history of Malaysia
British North Borneo
History of North Borneo
History of Sabah
Wars involving pre-independence Malaysia